Konstadinos "Kostas" Baniotis (born 6 November 1986 in Komotini, Rhodope) is a Greek high jumper.

Biography
He finished sixth at the 2009 European Indoor Championships, sixth at the 2009 European Team Championships (Super League), seventh at the 2009 World Athletics Final, eighth at the 2010 European Championships, while he took the 4th place in the 2011 European Indoor Championships, with a new personal record of 2.32 m. He also won the silver medal at the 2009 Mediterranean Games in Pescara. He competed at the 2008 Olympic Games, the 2012 Summer Olympics, and the 2009 World Championships without reaching the final.
His uncle is the former football player Charis Baniotis.

Competition record

References

External links
 
 

1986 births
Living people
Greek male high jumpers
Athletes (track and field) at the 2008 Summer Olympics
Olympic athletes of Greece
Athletes (track and field) at the 2012 Summer Olympics
Athletes (track and field) at the 2016 Summer Olympics
World Athletics Championships athletes for Greece
Mediterranean Games gold medalists for Greece
Mediterranean Games silver medalists for Greece
Athletes (track and field) at the 2009 Mediterranean Games
Athletes (track and field) at the 2013 Mediterranean Games
Mediterranean Games medalists in athletics
Sportspeople from Komotini
Competitors at the 2007 Summer Universiade